Wars and Treasure is a 2000 Iranian drama film directed by Hossein Shahabi (Persian: حسین شهابی)

Background
Release of the film is banned for 15 years issued by the Government of Iran for screening film festivals.

Starring
 Fariba Mortazavi
 Rasool Honarmand
 Parvin Solymani
 Ali Habibpoor
 Manoochehr Farhang
 Mohammad Taheri Azar
 Yaser Rakh
 Arezoo Kheyroshar
 Farrokhe Yazdanfar

Cast
 Director Of Photography: Bahman Zonoozi
 Sound Recorder: karim esbati
 Editor:Hossein Shahabi
 Music: Hossein Shahabi
 Costume Designer:Hossein Shahabi
 family Of Consulting: Fariba Poursaberi
 Planner: Mohammad Taheri Azar
 Assistsnts Director: Siavash Shahabi - Ahmad Shahabi

References

External links
 Wars and Treasure At/ Linkedin

2000 films
Iranian drama films
Films directed by Hossein Shahabi